Kavetka is a rural locality (a village) in Yeremeyevsky Selsoviet, Chishminsky District, Bashkortostan, Russia. The population was 30 as of 2010. There are 5 streets.

Geography 
Kavetka is located 8 km northwest of Chishmy (the district's administrative centre) by road. Yeremeyevo is the nearest rural locality.

References 

Rural localities in Chishminsky District